Top of the World Tour: Live was released by the Dixie Chicks as a DVD on November 21, 2003.  It is a concert video that documents performances from the group's 2003 Top of the World Tour. On December 16, 2003 Top of the World Tour: Live (DVD) was certified Platinum by the Recording Industry Association of America.

Track listing
  "Goodbye Earl"
  "Some Days You Gotta Dance"
  "There's Your Trouble"
  "Long Time Gone"
  "Tortured, Tangled Hearts"
  "Travelin' Soldier"
  "Hello Mr. Heartache"
  "Cold Day in July"
  "White Trash Wedding"
  "Lil' Jack Slade"
  "A Home"
  "If I Fall You're Going Down With Me"
  "Cowboy Take Me Away"
  "Godspeed (Sweet Dreams)"
  "Landslide"
  "Ready to Run"
  "Wide Open Spaces"
  "Sin Wagon"
  Bonus "Top of the World" Video

Personnel

Dixie Chicks
 Natalie Maines - Lead Vocals, Guitar
 Emily Robison - Guitar, Dobro, Banjo, Vocals
 Martie Maguire - Fiddle, Mandolin, Vocals

Band
 David Grissom - Band Leader, Electric Guitar, Acoustic Guitar
 Roscoe Beck - Electric Bass, Upright Bass
 John Deaderick - Keyboards, B-3 Organ, Accordion
 John Gardner - Drums, Percussion
 John Mock - Acoustic Guitar, Papoose, Irish Whistles, Concertina/Percussion
 Keith Sewell - Acoustic Guitar
 Brent Truitt - Mandolin
 Robby Turner - Steel Guitar, Dobro

Strings
 Lorenza Ponce - Violin, String Leader
 Matt Brubeck - Cello
 Linda Ghidossi-Deluca - Viola
 Hiroko Taguchi - Violin

Charts

Certifications

References 

The Chicks video albums